The Mainamati War Cemetery (alternatively: Comilla War Cemetery) is a war cemetery and a memorial in Comilla, Bangladesh, for Second World War graves from nearby areas. The cemetery contains 736 Commonwealth burials. It was established and maintained by the Commonwealth War Graves Commission, to pay tribute to those who sacrificed their lives. It is situated in the Comilla Cantonment area.

Gallery

See also 

 Chittagong Commonwealth War Cemetery

References

External links

 
 

History of Comilla
20th-century establishments in Bangladesh
Commonwealth War Graves Commission cemeteries in Bangladesh